Simona Vrzalová (born 7 April 1988) is a Czech middle-distance runner competing primarily in the 1500 metres. She represented her country at the 2017 World Championships and 2018 World Indoor Championships without advancing from the first round.

International competitions

Personal bests
Outdoor
400 metres – 56.42 (Uherské Hradiste 2018)
800 metres – 2:02.99 (Šamorín 2018)
1000 metres – 2:38.20 (Birmingham 2018)
1500 metres – 4:04.80 (Ostrava 2018)
One mile – 4:21.54 (London 2018)
3000 metres – 8:58.30 (Rovereto 2017)
5000 metres – 15:40.92 (Carquefou 2016)
5 kilometres – 18:45 (Bolzano 2010)
10 kilometres – 34:20 (Prague 2016)
Indoor
800 metres – 2:05.80 (Ostrava 2017)
1000 metres – 2:39.25 (Liévin 2019)
1500 metres – 4:10.04 (Ostrava 2017)
3000 metres – 8:57.07 (Ostrava 2018)

References

1988 births
Living people
Czech female middle-distance runners
World Athletics Championships athletes for the Czech Republic
Athletes (track and field) at the 2020 Summer Olympics
Olympic athletes of the Czech Republic